CFGN-FM is an FM radio station in Port aux Basques, Newfoundland and Labrador, Canada, broadcasting at 96.7 MHz. Originally launched as a repeater on August 7, 1971 at 1230 kHz, it opened its own studios in 1973. In 1996, it became a repeater of CFSX. The station is owned by Stingray Group.

CFGN carries the entire VOCM lineup except for a block of programming from CFCB on weekday mornings and for a six-hour block on Saturday mornings.

CFGN also has a repeater in St. Andrew's, CFCV-FM at 97.7 MHz.

On April 2, 2001, the sale of Humber Valley Broadcasting Co. Ltd. to Newcap Inc. was approved. This included CFGN and other radio stations such as:

CFCB Corner Brook
CFDL-FM Deer Lake
CFNW Port-aux-Choix
CFNN-FM St. Anthony
CFSX Stephenville
CFCV-FM St. Andrew's
CFLN Goose Bay
CFLW Wabush
CFLC-FM Churchill Falls

On October 13, 2016, Newcap applied to convert CFGN to 96.7 FM. The move was completed on November 1, 2017, and the old AM transmitter was shut down.

References

External links 
NewCap Radio - CFGN information
 
 

FGN
FGN
FGN